This is a list of mayors of Timișoara from 1718, when Banat, including Timișoara, were incorporated into the Kingdom of Hungary, to the present day when it is part of Romania. The position was created on 1 January 1718 by Count Claude Florimond de Mercy, governor of Banat, under the name of magistrate. Until 1780, Timișoara had two magistrates, one German for the German population settled here and one Illyrian or Rascian for the local population.

18th century 
 , 1718–1719
 Florian Blam, 1719–1720
 , 1720–1722
 , 1722–1742
 Andreas Pfann, 1742–1745
 Peter Mayer, 1745–1749
 Joseph Leibnitzer, 1749–1754
 Michael Auer, 1754–1756
 Anton Klang, 1756–1758
 Pietro Antonio Delpondio, 1758–1761
 Adam Ebelshauser, 1761–1762
 Joseph Anton Kulterer, 1762–1771
 Bartholomäus Lederer, 1771–1774
 Pietro Antonio Delpondio, 1774–1780
 Johann Michael Leudoldt, 1780–1782
 Pietro Antonio Delpondio, 1782–1786
 Adam Ingrueber, 1783–1786
 Thomas Reyhuber, 1786–1787
 Sebastian Schmid, 1787–1789
 Ignaz Koppauer, 1789–1808

19th century 
 Simon Petrovics, 1808–1810
 Peter Plavisics, 1810–1812
 Michael Kuenatter, 1812–1816
 József Tessényi, 1816–1819
 , 1819–1833
 Johann Speckner (Koronghy von Korongh), 1833–1844
 , 1844–1858
 Aloise Marguet (governing commissar), 1858–1859
 , 1859–1861
 Joseph Weigl, 1861–1867
 , 1867–1872
 Franz Steiner, 1872–1876
 , 1876–1885
 Karol Telbiz, 1885–1914

20th century 

 , 1914–1919
 Karl Leopold von Möller, 1919
 , 1919–1921
 , 1921–1922
 , 1922
 Lucian Georgevici, 1922–1926
 Samuil Sagovici, 1926
 Ioan Doboșan, 1926–1927
 , 1927
 Lucian Georgevici, 1927–1929
 Gheorghe Crăciun, 1929
 , 1929
 Franz Schmitz, 1929
 , 1929–1930
 Coriolan Balta, 1930–1931
 , 1931–1932
 Cornel Lazăr, 1932
 Liviu Gabor, 1932–1933
 Petru Olariu, 1933
 Augustin Coman, 1933–1937
 Alexandru Miletici, 1937–1938
 Gheorghe Andrașiu, 1938
 Nicolaie Table, 1938
 Vasile M. Teodorescu, 1938
 Rodig Modreanu, 1938
 , 1938–1939
 Emil Tieranu, 1939
 , 1939–1940
 Ilie Radu, 1940–1941
 , 1941
 Eugen Pop, 1941–1943
 Ioan Doboșan, 1943–1944
 Liviu Gabor, 1944–1945
 Traian Novac, 1945–1946
 Iosif Petric, 1946–1948
 Vasile Botezatu, 1948–1950
 Ion Hașmanian, 1950
 Ioan Jurjac, 1950–1953
 Valeriu Țidorescu, 1953
 Ioan Silindean, 1953–1954
 Radu Donosie, 1954–1956
 Vasile Botezatu, 1956–1961
 Ioan Popeți, 1961–1965
 Leonida Tămaș, 1965–1968
 , 1968–1971
 George Micota, 1971–1977
 , 1977–1980
 Petru Moț, 1980–1989
 Pompiliu Alămorean, 1990
 , 1990–1992
 Viorel Oancea (PAC), 1992–1996
 Gheorghe Ciuhandu (PNȚCD), 1996–2012

21st century 

 Gheorghe Ciuhandu (PNȚCD), 1996–2012
 Nicolae Robu (PNL), 2012–2020
 Dominic Fritz (USR), 2020–present

Notes

References

Sources 
 
 
 

Timisoara
List